Willem Rogier van Otterloo (11 December 1941 – 29 January 1988) was a Dutch composer and conductor.

Biography
Van Otterloo was the eldest son of the conductor Willem van Otterloo, in Bilthoven, Netherlands. He composed several soundtracks for Dutch films and in 1980 became conductor of the Metropole Orkest for jazz music in Amsterdam. He conducted five Dutch entries in Eurovision Song Contests:  "Amsterdam" (1980), "Het is een wonder" (1981), "Jij en ik" (1982), "Ik hou van jou" (1984) and "Rechtop in de wind" (1987). He has also composed jazz music.

He died from mesothelioma in Bilthoven in 1988.

Discography
 'Turks Fruit' 1973
 'Visions' 1974
 'Lets Go To Randstad/Randstad Reflection' 1974
 'Munich 74' 1974
 'On The Move' 1976
 'Moods' 1976
 'The French Collection' 1976
 'Heartbeat/Farewell Song' 1976
 'Soldaat van Oranje' 1977
 'Tin Pan Alley' 1978
 'Wereldsuccessen' 1978
 'Juliana 70' 1979
 'Grijpstra en de Gier'1979
 'Collage' 1980
 'First In The Air' 1984
 'Silver Selection' 1985
 'Verzameld Werk' 2005

Filmography
 Turkish Delight (1973)
  (1974)
 Help, de dokter verzuipt! (1974)
 Keetje Tippel (1975)
 Soldaat van Oranje (1977)
 Grijpstra & De Gier (1979)
 Vrijdag (1981)
 Te Gek Om Los te Lopen (1981)
 De Vlaschaard (1983)
 Op hoop van zegen (1986)

References

External links
 
 

1941 births
1988 deaths
Dutch conductors (music)
Male conductors (music)
Eurovision Song Contest conductors
Dutch jazz composers
Dutch film score composers
Musicians from Amsterdam
Deaths from cancer in the Netherlands
Deaths from mesothelioma
20th-century conductors (music)
Male film score composers
Male jazz composers
20th-century Dutch male musicians
20th-century jazz composers